Nasketucket Bay State Reservation, managed by the Massachusetts Department of Conservation and Recreation, is located in Mattapoisett, Massachusetts, along the coastline of southeast Massachusetts. The park includes  of rocky shoreline open field and wooded trails. A parking lot is located at the northeast corner of the reservation.

The reservation is accessed by Route 6, to Brandt Island Road to Brandt Beach Road. A parking lot is located at the northeast corner of the reservation and a trail leads circuitously south to the rocky beach at the bay. Before becoming a reservation, the land was going to be developed into house lots. The main trail loosely follows the original property owner’s driveway, and was cleared by the developers. The clearings intended for some of the houses are still visible. Nature has taken hold since, and now presents some very nice walking trails. Off-road vehicles are not permitted.

References

External links
Nasketucket Bay State Reservation Department of Conservation and Recreation

State parks of Massachusetts
Parks in Plymouth County, Massachusetts
Mattapoisett, Massachusetts
Protected areas established in 1999
1999 establishments in Massachusetts